Pörhölä (Keminmaa)  is a village in the municipality of Keminmaa in Lapland in north-western Finland.

External links
Satellite map at Maplandia

Villages in Finland
Keminmaa